Edward Keith Kildey (30 April 1919 – 12 February 2005) was an Australian cricketer. He played one first-class match for Tasmania in 1946/47.

See also
 List of Tasmanian representative cricketers

References

External links
 

1919 births
2005 deaths
Australian cricketers
Tasmania cricketers
People from the Riverina
Cricketers from New South Wales